Niko Pirosmani ( Nik’o Pirosmani), simply referred to as Nikala (ნიკალა Nik’ala; 1862–1918), was a Georgian painter who posthumously rose to prominence. Relatively poor for most of his life, he worked a variety of ordinary jobs. His rustic, everyday scenes are celebrated today for their depiction of the Georgia of Pirosmani's lifetime, and he has become one of the country's most beloved artistic figures.

Niko Pirosmani is alleged to be the inspiration for the male protagonist portrayed in the famous Russian song Million Roses.

Biography
Pirosmani was born in the Georgian village of Mirzaani to a peasant family in modern-day Kakheti province. His parents, Aslan Pirosmanashvili and Tekle Toklikishvili, were farmers, who owned a small vineyard, with a few cows and oxen. He was later orphaned and left in the care of his two elder sisters, Mariam and Pepe. He moved with them to Tbilisi in 1870. In 1872, while living in a little apartment not far from Tbilisi railway station, he worked as a servant to wealthy families and learned to read and write Russian and Georgian. In 1876, he returned to Mirzaani and worked as a herdsman.

Pirosmani gradually taught himself to paint. One of his specialties was painting directly into black oilcloth. In 1882, with self-taught George Zaziashvili, he opened a painting workshop, where they made signboards. In 1890, he worked as a railroad conductor. In 1893, he co-founded a dairy farm in Tbilisi, which he left in 1901. Throughout his life, Pirosmani, who was poor, was willing to take ordinary jobs including housepainting and whitewashing buildings. He also worked for shopkeepers in Tbilisi, creating signboards, paintings, and portraits, according to their orders. Although his paintings had some local popularity (about 200 survive) his relationship with professional artists remained uneasy; making a living was always more important to him than aesthetic abstractions.

In April 1918, he died in the 1918 flu pandemic as a result of malnutrition and liver failure. He was buried at the Nino cemetery; the exact location was not registered and is unknown.

Work

Pirosmani's paintings were influenced by the social conditions of his time and place. There are many works about merchants, shopkeepers, workmen, and noblemen groups. Pirosmani was fond of nature and rural life. He rarely employed city landscapes. He made many animal paintings. He was the only Georgian animalist. Pirosmani also was attracted by historical figures and themes such as Shota Rustaveli, Queen Tamar, Giorgi Saakadze, as well as ordinary Georgian people and their everyday lives.

Usually, Pirosmani painted on oilcloth. Unlike other artists, Niko didn't aim at a pure imitation of the nature and paid no attention to details. Some of his paintings are monochrome. His paintings demonstrate the author's sharp compositional consideration. Placements of the figures are frontal, while faces do not demonstrate a specific mood.

In the 1910s, he won the enthusiasm of the Russian poet Mikhail Le-Dantyu and the artist Kirill Zdanevich and his brother Ilia Zdanevich. Ilia Zhdanevich wrote a letter about Pirosmani to the newspaper Zakavkazskaia Rech, which it published on February 13, 1913. He undertook to publicise Pirosmani's painting in Moscow. The Moscow newspaper Moskovskaia Gazeta of 7 January wrote about the exhibition "Mishen" where self-taught painters exhibited, among them four works by Pirosmani: "Portrait of Zhdanevich", "Still Life", "Woman with a Beer Mug", and "The Roe". Critics writing later in the same newspaper were impressed with his talent.

In the same year, an article about Niko Pirosmani and his art was published in Georgian newspaper Temi.

The Society of Georgian Painters, founded in 1916 by Dito Shevardnadze, invited Pirosmani to its meetings and began to take him up, but his relations with the society were always uneasy. He presented his painting "Georgian Wedding" to the Society. One of the members published a caricature of him, which greatly offended him. His continuing poverty, compounded by the economic problems caused by the First World War, meant that his life ended with his work little recognised.

Posthumous reputation

After his death, Pirosmani gained international reputation when he became admired as a 'naïve' painter in Paris and elsewhere. His paintings were represented at the first big exhibition of Georgian painters in 1918. From 1920 onwards, a number of articles were published about him. The first monograph on Pirosmani was published in 1926 in Georgian, Russian, and French. 

Interest in Pirosmani increased in the 1950s.

In 1969, a film about him was made, titled Pirosmani. He inspired a portrait sketch by Pablo Picasso (1972). Pirosmani is also depicted on a Georgian lari bill (although this bill is rarely seen in circulation today, since 1 lari coins are far more common). A periodic newspaper titled Pirosmani is published in two languages in Istanbul. In 1983 Edward Kuznetsov produced the first catalogue raisonné on Pirosmani's work, entitled Niko Pirosmani, 1862-1918.

Exhibitions of his work have been held in Kyiv (1931), Warsaw (1968), Paris (The Louvre) (1969), Vienna (1969), Nice and Marseilles (1983), Tokyo (1986), Zurich (1995), Nantes (1999), Turin (2002), Kyiv, Istanbul (2008), Minsk, Vézelay and Vilnius (2008–2009), and Vienna again (2018/19).

Today, 146 of his works are shown in the Art Museum of Georgia and sixteen paintings are exhibited in the Historical-Ethnographic Museum of Sighnaghi. A monument was installed in Tbilisi. There is also the Niko Pirosmanashvili Museum in Mirzaani, Georgia, in one of his abodes.

Recent discoveries
In March 2011, it was discovered that the writing on the door of Qvrivishvilebi's wine-cellar in Ozaani was made by Pirosmani. On 31 May 2011, during an investigation, experts discovered a painting, which proved to be "Wounded Soldier" by Pirosmani. The painting was given to the National Gallery of Georgia.

Paintings

Footnotes

References
 Georgian National Museum, Niko Pirosmani 1862-1918, Tbilisi, 2006. No ISBN.
 «Пиросмани», Э Кузнецов, 1975, Искусство.
 «Легенда о Пиросмани», Валериан Маркаров, 2018

Further reading
Atroschenko, O., Bulatov, V., Kouteinikova, I., Solovyeva, K. and Schimmelpenninck van der Oye, D., Russia's Unknown Orient: Orientalist Painting 1850-1920, Nai010 Publishers, 2010.

External links

Biography
Olga's Gallery: Niko Pirosmani
A bilingual (Turkish and Georgian) quarterly journal, called Pirosmani  is published in Istanbul.
A contemporary art gallery that exhibits international emerging artists working in painting, photography, glass, ceramics and sculpture called Pirosmani  in Istanbul.

1862 births
1918 deaths
19th-century painters from Georgia (country)
20th-century painters from Georgia (country)
Modern artists
Naïve painters
Orientalist painters
People from Kakheti
Artists from Tbilisi
Deaths from Spanish flu
Painters from the Russian Empire
Male painters